The Duinencross Koksijde ("Cyclo-cross of Dunes") is a cyclo-cross race held in Koksijde, Belgium since 1969. It is part of the UCI Cyclo-cross World Cup since 1996.

Past winners

References
 Men's results
 Women's results

UCI Cyclo-cross World Cup
Cycle races in Belgium
Cyclo-cross races
Recurring sporting events established in 1969
1969 establishments in Belgium
Sport in Koksijde